Clonarney is a civil parish in County Westmeath, Ireland.

Clonarney is one of 7 civil parishes in the barony of Delvin in the Province of Leinster.

Clonarney civil parish comprises 5 townlands: Clonarney, Mulliganstown, Scurlockstown, Sheepstown and Stonestown.

The neighbouring civil parishes are: Killallon  County Meath to the north, Delvin to the north, east and south, Kilcumny and St. Mary's to the west.

References

External links
Clonarney civil parish at the IreAtlas Townland Data Base
Clonarney civil parish at townlands.ie
Clonarney civil parish at The Placename Database of Ireland

Civil parishes of County Westmeath